The 2021–22 Sport Lisboa e Benfica season was the club's 118th season in existence and its 88th consecutive season in the top flight of Portuguese football. Domestically, Benfica played in the Primeira Liga, were eliminated in the fifth round of Taça de Portugal, and reached the Taça da Liga final. In Europe, Benfica reached the quarter-finals of the UEFA Champions League. The season started on 4 August 2021, with the third qualifying round of the Champions League, and concluded on 13 May 2022 with a third-place finish in the league. This was Benfica's second consecutive season and third year without any trophy won.

Players

First-team squad

Transfers

In

Out

Pre-season friendlies

Non-televised friendlies, played at Benfica Campus:

 Benfica 0–1 Benfica B (3 July)
 Benfica 2–0 Sporting da Covilhã (7 July)
 Benfica 3–2 Farense (10 July)
 Benfica 0–0 Belenenses SAD (13 July)

Competitions

Overall record

Primeira Liga

League table

Results summary

Results by round

Matches

Taça de Portugal

Taça da Liga

Third round

Semi-finals

Final

UEFA Champions League

Third qualifying round
The draw for the third qualifying round was held on 19 July 2021.

Play-off round
The draw for the play-off round was held on 2 August 2021.

Group stage

The draw for the group stage was held on 26 August 2021.

Knockout phase

Round of 16
The draw for the round of 16 was held on 13 December 2021.

Quarter-finals
The draw for the quarter-finals was held on 18 March 2022.

Statistics

Appearances and goals

|-
! colspan=18 style=background:#dcdcdc; text-align:center|Goalkeepers

|-
! colspan=18 style=background:#dcdcdc; text-align:center|Defenders

|-
! colspan=18 style=background:#dcdcdc; text-align:center|Midfielders

|-
! colspan=18 style=background:#dcdcdc; text-align:center|Forwards

|-
! colspan=18 style=background:#dcdcdc; text-align:center|Players who made an appearance and/or had a squad number but left the team.

|}

Notes

References

S.L. Benfica seasons
Benfica
Benfica